Kimberly Noel Kardashian (formerly West; born October 21, 1980) is an American socialite, media personality, and businesswoman. She first gained media attention as a friend and stylist of Paris Hilton, but received wider notice after the sex tape Kim Kardashian, Superstar, shot in 2003 with her then-boyfriend Ray J, was released in 2007. Later that year, she and her family began to appear in the E! reality television series Keeping Up with the Kardashians (2007–2021). Its success led to the formation of the spin-off series Kourtney and Kim Take New York (2011–2012), Kourtney and Kim Take Miami (2009–2013), and Hulu's The Kardashians (2022).

Kardashian has developed a significant presence online and across numerous social media platforms, including hundreds of millions of followers on Twitter and Instagram. With sisters Kourtney and Khloé, she launched the fashion boutique chain Dash, which operated from 2006 to 2018. Kardashian founded KKW Beauty and KKW Fragrance in 2017, and the shaping underwear or foundation garment company Skims in 2019. She has released a variety of products tied to her name, including the 2014 mobile game Kim Kardashian: Hollywood and the 2015 photo book Selfish. As an actress, she has appeared in the films Disaster Movie (2008), Deep in the Valley (2009), and Temptation: Confessions of a Marriage Counselor (2013), and provided her voice for PAW Patrol: The Movie (2021).

Time magazine included Kardashian on their list of 2015's 100 most influential people. Both critics and admirers have described her as exemplifying the notion of being famous for being famous. She is estimated to be worth US$1.8 billion, as of 2022. Kardashian has become more politically active by lobbying for prison reform and clemency, and is currently under a four-year law apprenticeship supervised by the legal nonprofit #cut50. Her relationship with rapper Kanye West has also received significant media coverage; they were married from 2014 to 2022 and have four children together.

Early life and education
Kimberly Noel Kardashian was born on October 21, 1980, in Los Angeles, California, to Robert and Kris Kardashian (née Houghton). She has an older sister, Kourtney, a younger sister, Khloé, and a younger brother, Rob. Their mother is of Dutch, English, Irish, and Scottish ancestry, while their father was a third-generation Armenian-American. In 1991, their parents divorced and their mother married Bruce Jenner, the 1976 Summer Olympics decathlon winner. As a result of her mother's remarriage, Kim Kardashian acquired step-brothers Burton "Burt", Brandon, and Brody; a step-sister, Casey; and later  two half-sisters, Kendall and Kylie Jenner.

Kardashian attended Marymount High School, a Roman Catholic all-girls school in Los Angeles. In 1994, her father represented football player O. J. Simpson during his murder trial. Simpson is Kardashian's godfather. Kardashian's father died in 2003 of cancer. In her teenage years, Kardashian was a close friend of Nicole Richie and Paris Hilton, through whom she first garnered media attention. After totaling her car at age 16, her father agreed to buy her a new one on condition that she agree to be responsible for paying all expenses related to any future damages. She subsequently began working at Body, a local clothing store in Encino, California, where she worked for four years, assisting in the opening of the Calabasas location. In 2000, after entering into her first marriage, she resigned.

Career

Beginnings (2003–2006)
By 2003, Kardashian was working as a personal stylist to the R&B singer and actress, Brandy, the sister of Ray J. Later, the  siblings' mother (and manager) Sonja Norwood, alleged that in 2004 she had authorized Kardashian to make "one and only one" purchase on her American Express credit card and that nevertheless Kardashian and her sisters Khloé and Kourtney had incurred over $120,000 in unauthorized charges to that card. Norwood also alleged that the bulk of the charges were attributable to purchases made at Kardashian's family-owned boutique in 2006 and 2007, after Kardashian was no longer employed by Norwood's daughter. Norwood further alleged that, at the request of her children, she did not file criminal charges, instead presenting her allegations personally to Kardashian, and that Kardashian apologized and promised to repay the debt. In 2008, no payments having been forthcoming, Norwood filed a lawsuit. Kardashian has denied all these allegations. In 2009, the parties reportedly reached a confidential settlement, and the lawsuit was dismissed.

In 2006, Kardashian had begun working as a stylist for Paris Hilton, a childhood friend of hers. She appeared in several episodes of the reality series The Simple Life and was frequently photographed accompanying Hilton to events and parties. Sheeraz Hasan, a PR strategist working with Hilton, had previously met Kardashian and her mother Kris Jenner in 2005, and stated in a 2020 20/20 television special that Kardashian was "ready to do whatever it takes" to create a successful brand. Rick Mendozza, a freelance photographer on assignment for the tabloid TMZ, remarked in the same interview that, when Kardashian accompanied Hilton to Hyde, which was a Hollywood hotspot at the time, he continued to get assignments from tabloids to get photographs of Kardashian for the next three years. In 2021, Kardashian said that Hilton "literally gave me a career. And I totally acknowledge that."

Breakthrough (2007–2010)

In February 2007, a sex tape made by Kardashian and Ray J in 2003 was leaked. Kardashian filed a lawsuit against Vivid Entertainment, who distributed the film as Kim Kardashian, Superstar. She later dropped the suit and settled for a reported 5 million, allowing Vivid to release the tape. Several media outlets later criticized her and the family for using the sex tape's release as a publicity stunt to promote their forthcoming reality show. In October 2007, Kardashian and her mother, Kris Jenner, her step-parent Caitlyn Jenner, her siblings Kourtney, Khloé, and Rob Kardashian, and half-sisters Kendall and Kylie Jenner, began to appear in the reality television series Keeping Up with the Kardashians. The series proved successful for E!, and led to the creation of a number of spin-offs, including Kourtney and Kim Take New York and Kourtney and Kim Take Miami. The flagship series concluded in 2021 after 294 episodes. 

Kardashian posed in a nude pictorial for the December 2007 issue of Playboy, and appeared on the cover of the November 2010 issue of Romanian Playboy, promoting a pictorial titled "Poezia Unui Fund Bombat" (The Poetry of a Bulging Ass). She made her feature film debut, opposite Carmen Electra, in the disaster film spoof Disaster Movie (2008), in which she appeared as a character named Lisa. In 2008, she was a participant on season seven of Dancing with the Stars, where she was partnered with Mark Ballas. She was the third contestant to be eliminated. In September 2009, Fusion Beauty and Seven Bar Foundation launched "Kiss Away Poverty", with Kardashian as the face of the campaign. For each LipFusion lipgloss sold, 1 went to the Foundation to fund women entrepreneurs in the United States. In October, she launched her first fragrance, self-titled "Kim Kardashian". That year, she also released a workout DVD series, became a guest host–judge of WrestleMania XXIV on America's Next Top Model, and guest-starred in How I Met Your Mother, Beyond the Break, and CBS's CSI: NY.

By 2010, Kardashian had ventured into several new endorsement deals, including endorsing various food products for Carl's Jr. On July 1, 2010, the New York City branch of Madame Tussauds revealed a wax figure of Kardashian. Kim, Kourtney, and Khloé wrote an autobiography titled Kardashian Konfidential, which was released in stores on November 23, 2010, and appeared on New York Timess Best Seller List. In December 2010, she filmed a music video for a song titled "Jam (Turn It Up)". The video was directed by Hype Williams; Kanye West makes a cameo in the video. Kardashian premiered the song during a New Year's Eve party at TAO Las Vegas on December 31, 2010. The song was produced by The-Dream and Tricky Stewart. When asked if an album was in the works, Kardashian replied, "There's no album in the works or anything—just one song we did for Kourtney and Kim Take New York, and a video Hype Williams directed, half of the proceeds we're giving away to a cancer foundation, because The-Dream's and one of my parents passed away from cancer. It's just all having fun—with a good cause". Jim Farber, writing for the Daily News, called the song a "dead-brained piece of generic dance music, without a single distinguishing feature", and suggested that the single made Kardashian the "worst singer in the reality TV universe".

In 2010, Kardashian also served as producer for The Spin Crowd, a reality television show about a New York City public relations firm run by Jonathan Cheban and Simon Huck, appeared on season ten of The Apprentice, and guest starred with Khloé and Kourtney as themselves on the season three premiere episode of the series 90210. The International Business Times reported that Kardashian's 2010 earnings were the highest among Hollywood-based reality stars, estimating them at $6 million.

Continued exposure (2011–2016)
In 2011, Kardashian released her third fragrance, "Gold", as well as a novel, Dollhouse, along with sisters Kourtney and Khloe. In 2012, E! renewed Keeping Up with the Kardashians for two additional seasons, in a deal reported to be worth $50 million. That year, Kardashian released her fourth fragrance, "True Reflection", which she worked with the company Dress for Success to promote, and her fifth fragrance, "Glam", which was made available through Debenhams. In Temptation: Confessions of a Marriage Counselor (2013), a romantic drama produced, written, and directed by Tyler Perry, Kardashian obtained the role of the co-worker of an ambitious therapist. While the film was a moderate box office success, with a worldwide gross of US$53.1 million, critical response was negative and Kardashian won the Razzie Award for Worst Supporting Actress.

Kardashian released Kim Kardashian: Hollywood, a mobile game for iPhone and Android, in June 2014. The objective of the game is to become a Hollywood star or starlet. The game supports a free to play model, meaning the game is free to download, but charges for in-game items. It was a hit, earning 1.6 million in its first five days of release. In July, developer Glu Mobile announced that the game was the fifth highest earning game in Apple's App Store. She voiced an alien in the September 21, 2014 episode of the adult animated series American Dad!.

Kardashian appeared on the cover and in a pictorial in Papers winter 2014 issue, photographed by Jean-Paul Goude. On the cover, her nude buttocks are featured above the caption: "Break the Internet", which generated considerable comment in both social and traditional media. A Time magazine writer commented that, unlike previous celebrities' nudes that represented the women's rebellion against repressed society and "trying to tear down" barriers, Kardashian's exhibition was "just provocation and bluster, repeated images that seem to offer us some sort of truth or insight but are really just self serving. We want there to be something more, some reason or context, some great explanation that tells us what it is like to live in this very day and age, but there is not. Kim Kardashian's ass is nothing but an empty promise." However, the stunt "set a new benchmark" in social media response, and Papers website received 15.9 million views in one day, compared with 25,000 views on an average day.

Kardashian released a portfolio book called Selfish, a 325-page collection of self-taken photos of herself, in May 2015. It received positive reviews from critics, with Kat Brown of The Telegraph describing it as "unexpectedly revealing" and "oddly moving". That year, she was also the cover model for the August issue of Vogue Spain, and released an emoji pack for iOS devices called Kimoji. The app was a best-seller, becoming one of the top 5 most bought apps in its first week of release.

By November 2016, as per CBC Marketplace and interviews with celebrity endorsement experts, Kardashian was reportedly paid at least US$300,000 for each post that she made on Instagram, Facebook and Twitter, endorsing beauty products like waist trainers, teeth whiteners as well as Coca-Cola and well-known charities.  Business Insider later estimated her fee to be around US$720,000 per Instagram post. Even though engagement data indicates that her posts are worth slightly less, her regular features in the news allows her to demand a premium above any calculated Instagram sponsored post price.

Business ventures (2017–present)
With sisters Kourtney and Khloé, she launched the fashion boutique chain Dash with an initial store in Calabasas, California. The chain operated between 2006 and 2018.

In 2017, Kardashian launched both her beauty and fragrance lines, KKW Beauty and KKW Fragrance. She made a cameo appearance in the heist film Ocean's 8, which was released on June 8, 2018.

After announcing a new range of shapewear called Kimono in June 2019, Kardashian was heavily criticized over the name of the brand, which critics argued  disrespected Japanese culture and ignored the significance behind the traditional outfit. Following the launch of the range, the hashtag #KimOhNo began trending on Twitter and the mayor of Kyoto wrote to Kardashian to ask her to reconsider the trademark on Kimono. In response to public pressure, she announced that she would change the name. However, Japanese trade minister Hiroshige Seko stated that he would still be dispatching patent officials for a meeting at the U.S. Patent and Trademark Office, and that Japan would keep an eye on the situation. In August 2019, she changed and rebranded the shapewear company to the name Skims, officially launching the following month on its own digital store and later made available on various other websites (such as online stores of SSENSE, David Jones, Net-a-Porter, Ounass).

In February 2020, under a retail partnership with Nordstrom, Skims' products were made available to shop exclusively at the chain's stores across the United States. The company has also expanded into lingerie, bodysuits, loungewear, dresses, and winterwear. Since 2021, Skims has opened various pop-up stores in the United States, Europe and Asia. In June 2021, Kardashian revealed the brand entered into a partnership with the US Olympics team under which the company would provide undergarments, loungewear and pajamas and other clothing items with American flags and the Olympics rings with a Team USA branding printed on them to the team's female athletes at the 2020 Summer Olympics and Paralympics. The athletes also wore Skims' clothing at the 2022 Winter Olympics, and were featured in the brand's campaign for a capsule collection launched ahead of the event, in collaboration with the United States' Winter Olympics delegation. In November 2021, luxury fashion house Fendi released a capsule collection in collaboration with Skims, consisting of a range of shapewear, leather dresses, and bodysuits. That month, Kardashian was honored with the Brand Innovator award, for her work on Skims, at the 2021 WSJ. Innovator Awards. In January 2022, it was reported that her company stood at a valuation of US$3.2 billion.

Kardashian hosted Saturday Night Live in October 2021 and in her monologue, she made fun of her estranged-husband Kanye West, her mother's ex-husband Caitlyn Jenner, her sisters, O. J. Simpson and others.

In January 2022, in a class-action lawsuit filed against the cryptocurrency company EthereumMax that alleged the company is a pump and dump scheme, Kardashian was named as a defendant along with former professional boxer Floyd Mayweather Jr., former NBA player Paul Pierce, and other celebrities for promoting the EthereumMax token on their social media accounts. In October 2022, the U.S. Securities and Exchange Commission announced that Kardashian had agreed to pay a $1.26 million fine, to not promote cryptocurrency assets for three years, and to cooperate with an ongoing investigation without admitting or denying wrongdoing for failing to report receiving a $250,000 payment to promote the EthereumMax token. In December 2022, Central California U.S. District Court Judge Michael W. Fitzgerald dismissed the lawsuit on the basis that the claims were insufficiently supported given heightened pleading standards for fraud.

In April 2022, Kardashian founded Skky Partners, a private equity firm, with a former partner of the Carlyle Group. Her mother, Kris Jenner, is also a partner at the firm. In July 2022, she made her Paris Fashion Week modeling debut on the catwalk for fashion house Balenciaga, along with Nicole Kidman, Dua Lipa, and Christine Quinn (from the reality television series Selling Sunset).

Personal life

Relationships

In 2000, at the age of 19, Kardashian eloped with music producer Damon Thomas. Thomas filed for divorce in 2003. Kardashian later blamed their separation on physical and emotional abuse on his part and said she was high on ecstasy during their wedding ceremony. Before her divorce was finalized, Kardashian began dating singer Ray J.

In May 2011, Kardashian became engaged to NBA player Kris Humphries, then of the New Jersey Nets, whom she had been dating since October 2010. They were married in a wedding ceremony on August 20 in Montecito, California. Earlier that month, she had released her "wedding fragrance" called "Kim Kardashian Love" which coincided with her own wedding. A two-part TV special showing the preparations and the wedding itself aired on E! in early October 2011, amidst what The Washington Post called a "media blitz" related to the wedding. After 72 days of marriage, she filed for divorce from Humphries on October 31, citing irreconcilable differences. Several news outlets surmised that Kardashian's marriage to Humphries was merely a publicity stunt to promote the Kardashian family's brand and their subsequent television ventures. A man professing to be her former publicist, Jonathan Jaxson, also claimed that her short-lived marriage was indeed staged and a ploy to generate money. Kardashian filed a suit against Jaxson, saying his claims were untrue, and subsequently settled the case that included an apology from Jaxson. A widely circulated petition asking to remove all Kardashian-related programming from the air followed the split. The divorce was subject to widespread media attention.

Kardashian began dating rapper and longtime friend Kanye West in April 2012, while still legally married to Humphries. Her divorce was finalized on June 3, 2013, Kardashian and West became engaged on October 21, Kardashian's 33rd birthday, and married on May 24, 2014, at Forte di Belvedere in Florence, Italy. Her wedding dress was designed by Riccardo Tisci of Givenchy with some guests' dresses designed by designer Michael Costello. The couple's high status and respective careers have resulted in their relationship becoming subject to heavy media coverage; The New York Times referred to their marriage as "a historic blizzard of celebrity". West said Kardashian was his muse.

In January 2021, CNN reported that the couple were discussing divorce and on February 19, 2021, Kardashian officially filed for divorce. In April 2021, they both agreed before court that they would end their marriage due to "irreconcilable differences" and agreed to joint custody of their four children. They also agreed that neither of them need spousal support. In February 2022, Kardashian filed a complaint to the Los Angeles Superior Court, asking for a quicker proceedings in the divorce from West, saying that West was trying to delay it and saying that "Mr. West, by his actions, has made it clear that he does not accept that the parties' marital relationship is over." Kardashian was declared legally single on March 2, 2022. This allowed her to drop "West" as her legal last name. Their divorce was finalized on November 29, 2022.

Kardashian began dating actor and comedian Pete Davidson in November 2021. In August 2022, they ended their relationship.

Religion
Kim Kardashian is a Christian and has described herself as "really religious". She was educated in Christian schools of both the Presbyterian and Roman Catholic traditions. In October 2019, she was baptized in an Armenian Apostolic ceremony at the baptistery in the Etchmiadzin Cathedral complex and given the Armenian name Heghine (Հեղինէ).

In April 2015, Kardashian and West traveled to the Armenian Quarter of the Old City in Jerusalem to have their daughter North baptized in the Armenian Apostolic Church, one of the oldest denominations of Oriental Orthodox Christianity. The ceremony took place at the Cathedral of St. James. Khloé Kardashian was appointed the godmother of North. In October 2019, Kim baptized her three younger children at the baptistery in the Etchmiadzin Cathedral complex, Armenia's mother church. Psalm was given the Armenian name Vardan, Chicago received Ashkhen and Saint received Grigor.

Health and pregnancies
Kardashian and West have four children: daughter North (born June 15, 2013), son Saint (born December 5, 2015), daughter Chicago (born January 15, 2018), and son Psalm (born May 9, 2019).

Kardashian has publicly discussed difficulties during her first two pregnancies. She experienced pre-eclampsia during her first, which forced her to deliver at 34 weeks. With both pregnancies, she developed placenta accreta after delivery, eventually undergoing surgery to remove the placenta and scar tissue. After her second pregnancy, doctors advised her not to become pregnant again; her third and fourth children were born via surrogacy. Kardashian has also spoken about her psoriasis.

In May 2021, it was reported that Kardashian had tested positive for COVID-19 in November 2020. She confirmed this report but denied reports that she caught the disease after hosting a party at a private island.

Wealth

In May 2014, Kardashian was estimated to be worth 45 million. In 2015, Forbes reported she had "made more this year than ever as her earnings nearly doubled to $53 million from 2014's $28 million", and reported that she "has monetized fame better than any other". Much of her income includes wholesale earnings of the Sears line, the Kardashian Kollection, which brought in $600 million in 2013 and the Kardashian Beauty cosmetics line, Kardashian-branded tanning products, the boutique-line DASH, as well as sponsored social media posts which are collectively worth $300,000–500,000 per post. As of July 2018, Kardashian was worth US$350 million. Kardashian does not receive alimony payments from either of her first two marriages. On April 6, 2021, Forbes estimated Kardashian's net worth at US$1 billion.

Paris robbery
On October 2, 2016, while attending Paris Fashion Week, Kardashian was robbed at gunpoint in the apartment where she was staying. Five individuals, dressed as police officers, bound and gagged her, then stole $10 million worth of jewelry. The thieves got in her residence by threatening the concierge. Once they accessed Kardashian's room, they held a gun to her head, tying her wrists and legs and wrapping duct tape around her mouth as a gag. Kardashian, who was placed in the bathtub, was physically unharmed and reportedly begged for her life. She managed to wriggle her hands free from the plastic ties around her wrists and scream for help. The thieves escaped. On October 6, 2016, it was revealed that filming for the next season of Keeping up with the Kardashians had been placed "on hold indefinitely" after the robbery.

After the robbery was announced, several critics expressed skepticism about whether it was staged or not, with some even drawing comparison to Olympic swimmer Ryan Lochte's recent false robbery claim. On October 10, 2016, a video was released showing Kardashian immediately after the robbery, as police began conducting their investigation. In the video, she is seen using the cell phone that she had reported stolen, and did not have any of the markings she claimed from being bound by her captors, prompting more questions as to whether or not the events were staged. In response, Kardashian filed lawsuits against several media outlets the following day, and secured a gag order to get the video removed from any articles due to it being part of an active police investigation. On October 25, 2016, Kardashian dropped the lawsuit, prompting more criticism that the robbery was a ploy to generate media attention. Production resumed on Keeping Up with the Kardashians on October 26.

On January 9, 2017, French police detained 17 persons of interest for questioning in the robbery case. Later in 2017, 16 people were arrested for their alleged involvement. It was revealed in 2020 that French prosecutors would seek trial for 12 of the suspects. The suspects who allegedly entered her room were of, or near, senior age and were named the 'Grandpa Robbers' by the press.  In 2021, the suspects were still awaiting trial with at least one of the five who entered Kardashian's room reportedly set to plead no contest to the charges.

Activism 
During an interview with Caity Weaver of GQ for the July 2016 issue, Kardashian described herself as a Democrat, and declared support for Hillary Clinton in the 2016 U.S. presidential election.

In January 2017, she tweeted a table of statistics that went viral, highlighting statistics that show that gun violence in the United States kills 11,737 people annually while terrorism in the United States kills 14 people annually. In December 2017, the tweet was mentioned by the Royal Statistical Society in the announcement of its "International Statistic of the Year" for 2017. On a trip to Uganda in October 2018, she and her husband met with President Yoweri Museveni. They had a press conference, and Kanye talked about tourism in Uganda. They were criticized for meeting Museveni due to his being a dictator and his recent crackdown on the opposition and the Ugandan LGBT community.

In April 2019, Vogue reported that Kardashian was studying to pass the bar exam; instead of attending law school, she is "reading law". In 2021, Kardashian said she had failed her first-year law exam (the baby bar) for a second time, performing "slightly worse" than her first attempt earlier in the year. In December 2021, she passed the "baby bar" law exam on her fourth attempt.

In 2020, Kardashian condemned the actions of Azerbaijan in the 2020 Nagorno-Karabakh conflict and expressed her support to Armenia and the Republic of Artsakh. On November 20, 2021, it was reported that Kardashian and the English soccer club Leeds United F.C. had financially helped female Afghan soccer players to make their way to England. The women and girls had escaped Afghanistan following the Taliban takeover, but were stranded in Pakistan.

Kardashian has also contributed to private GoFundMe causes, especially of people affected by the COVID-19 pandemic. In September 2021, she donated $3,000 to a mother of four who had lost her husband to COVID-19 and was about to be evicted from her home.

Armenian genocide recognition

Kardashian has expressed pride in her Armenian and Scottish ancestry. She is not a citizen of either Armenia or the United Kingdom and does not speak Armenian. She has advocated for the recognition of the Armenian Genocide on numerous occasions and encouraged President Barack Obama and the United States government to consider its acknowledgement. In April 2016, Kardashian wrote an article on her website condemning The Wall Street Journal for running an advertisement by FactCheckArmenia.com denying the Armenian Genocide. In April 2021, Kardashian wrote a letter to President Joe Biden thanking him for officially recognizing the Armenian Genocide, thus becoming the first ever United States president to do so.

In April 2015, Kardashian traveled to Armenia with her husband, her sister Khloé, and her daughter North and visited the Armenian Genocide memorial Tsitsernakaberd in Yerevan. On October 10, 2020, Kardashian announced she donated $1 million to Armenia Fund, a humanitarian organization that supports Armenia's development.

Prison reform and clemency advocacy
Kardashian has worked in the area of prison reform, advocating for the commutation of the sentence of Chris Young and also of Alice Marie Johnson, a woman who received a life sentence for a first-time drug offense as the leader of a major cocaine ring in Tennessee which was granted by President Donald Trump in June 2018. Along with Van Jones and Jared Kushner, she was instrumental in persuading President Trump to support the First Step Act, which enacted major reforms in the US prison system. Van Jones later stated that without Kardashian, the act would have never passed because it would not have received the president's support. It was later passed by a great majority in the US Senate.

In 2019, Kardashian largely funded the 90 Days to Freedom campaign, an initiative to release nonviolent drug offenders from life sentences by attorneys Brittany K. Barnett and MiAngel Cody. The effort resulted in 17 persons being released under provisions of the First Step Act. Kardashian was widely credited for the success of the campaign in media headlines. Commentary on her involvement ranged from praise, to assertions that it was a public relations stunt, to accusations that she was taking the credit for work she did not do. In a Facebook post from May 7 of that year, Barnett commented on the divisive and underfunded nature of the "criminal justice reform space", adding, "Kim linked arms with us to support us when foundations turned us down. We and our clients and their families have a lot of love for her and are deeply grateful for her."

In April 2022, Kardashian advocated for the clemency of Melissa Lucio, the only woman of Hispanic descent on Texas' death row, in a series of tweets. She tweeted, "I recently just read about the case of Melissa Lucio and wanted to share her story with you. She has been on death row for over 14 years for her daughter's death that was a tragic accident." Lucio is on death row for the abuse and death of her daughter, who was two years old. Kardashian deleted the series of tweets the same day. When Lucio was granted a stay of execution on April 25, Kardashian celebrated on her social media channels.

In July 2022, Kardashian expressed support and petitioned for the release of rapper Gunna, who was imprisoned without bond, charged with one count of violating the Racketeer Influenced and Corrupt Organizations Act. However, in October of the same year, Gunna was again denied release from jail ahead of his January trial. In December, Gunna pled guilty to a single charge of racketeering and was sentenced to five years in prison, with one year commuted to time served and the rest of the sentence suspended subject to probation conditions. He was later released from jail.

Filmography

 Kim Kardashian, Superstar (2007)
 Keeping Up with the Kardashians (2007–2021)
 Disaster Movie (2008)
 Kourtney and Kim Take Miami (2009–2013)
 Kourtney and Kim Take New York (2011–2012)
 Temptation: Confessions of a Marriage Counselor (2013)
 Dash Dolls (2015)
 PAW Patrol: The Movie (2021)
 The Kardashians (2022)

Awards and nominations
Teen Choice Awards

Other awards

Bibliography

See also
 Famous for being famous
 List of most-followed Instagram accounts
 List of most-followed Twitter accounts

Notes

References

External links

 
 
 

Kim Kardashian
1980 births
Actresses from Los Angeles
American billionaires
American bloggers
American cosmetics businesspeople
American fashion businesspeople
American fashion designers
American film actresses
American people of Armenian descent
American people of Dutch descent
American people of English descent
American people of Irish descent
American people of Scottish descent
American reality television producers
American retail chief executives
American socialites
American television actresses
American victims of crime
American women chief executives
Armenian Apostolic Christians
Businesspeople from Los Angeles
Businesspeople in online retailing
Female models from California
Kanye West
Kardashian family
Living people
Models from Los Angeles
Participants in American reality television series
American women bloggers
People from Hidden Hills, California
People from Calabasas, California
American Oriental Orthodox Christians
Television producers from California
American women television producers
21st-century American businesswomen
21st-century American businesspeople
American gun control activists
American women fashion designers
Female billionaires
California Democrats
Muses
Basketball players' wives and girlfriends